Katharine Elizabeth Young Yaroslavsky (born May 30, 1980) is an American attorney and politician who is currently a member of the Los Angeles City Council representing the 5th district. A member of the Democratic Party, Yaroslavsky placed first by a wide margin in the 2022 election to replace Paul Koretz, before winning in the general election against attorney Sam Yebri in a landslide. The daughter-in-law of former councilmember, supervisor, and County Chair Zev Yaroslavsky, she worked in the office of Sheila Kuehl, whom her mother previously worked for.

Early life and career 
Young Yaroslavsky was born Katharine Elizabeth Young on May 30, 1980. She graduated Phi Beta Kappa with a Bachelor's degree from University of California, Berkeley and received her Juris Doctor degree from University of California, Los Angeles.

Yaroslavsky got into politics as a deputy for Sheila Kuehl when Kuehl was elected to the Los Angeles County Board of Supervisors; Yaroslavsky's mother also worked for Kuehl when she was in the California State Legislature. While a deputy, she helped with the creation of the Office of Sustainability and the creation and passing of Measure W in 2018. Before being named in Kuehl's staff, she was the ceneral counsel and director of government affairs at the nonprofit Climate Action Reserve.

Political career

Los Angeles City Council 
In September 2021, Yaroslavsky announced that she would be running to replace Paul Koretz on the Los Angeles City Council for the 5th district. In the primary election, Yaroslavsky and Sam Yebri advanced to the general runoff election, with Yaroslavsky taking a majority of the votes. In the general election, Young Yaroslavsky won against Yebri in a landslide.

In 2023, she was named to be on the Transportation Committee, the first all-female committee, alongside Traci Park, Eunisses Hernandez, Nithya Raman, and Heather Hutt.

Personal life 
Young Yaroslavsky is married to David Yaroslavsky, a Los Angeles County Superior Court judge, with the two having three children. She is the daughter-in-law to Zev Yaroslavsky, a former member of the Los Angeles County Board of Supervisors who held the same seat in the City Council from 1975 to 1994.

Electoral history

References 

Los Angeles City Council members
1980 births
Living people
California Democrats
21st-century American women politicians